Aerenea albilarvata is a species of beetle in the family Cerambycidae. It was described by Henry Walter Bates in 1866. It is known from French Guiana, Brazil and Peru.

References

Compsosomatini
Beetles described in 1866